Joseph Lapsley Wilson (September 17, 1844 in Philadelphia – April 12, 1928 in Merion, Pennsylvania) was an American railroad executive, author and horticulturalist. A Civil War veteran, he wrote two histories of Philadelphia's First City Troop.

Son of William Wilson, a merchant, he was educated at West Chester Academy in West Chester, Pennsylvania. In 1862 he enlisted in the Union Army, becoming a member of C Company Grays Reserves. He saw fire in July 1863 at Carlisle, Pennsylvania (north of Gettysburg). At discharge, he held the rank of sergeant.

Following the war, he became secretary of the Little Schuylkill Navigation, Railroad and Coal Company, a division of the Reading Railroad, which transported anthracite from Northeastern Pennsylvania's coal region. He worked for the company for 38 years.

In 1867, he was elected to the First Troop Philadelphia City Cavalry, the oldest continually-active military unit in the United States. Part of the Pennsylvania Army National Guard, he served as the troop's captain, 1889-1894, and wrote its centennial history in 1875. Forty years later, he revised and updated the history: Book of the First Troop, Philadelphia City Cavalry, 1774-1914 (1915).

He was a director of the Commercial Bank of Philadelphia, a member of the Union League of Philadelphia and of the National Republican League. He advocated for civil rights for Native Americans, and opposed American imperialism.

In the late 1870s, he bought land in Merion, Pennsylvania, just over the Philadelphia city line. He built a mansion, "Red Slates", and turned the grounds into an arboretum, collecting more than 200 specimens of trees. In 1901, he married Caroline Alice Yates.

In 1922, he sold the estate to Dr. Albert C. Barnes, and he and his wife moved to a smaller house on the property. Barnes demolished the mansion to build his art gallery, but preserved the arboretum. Wilson served as the arboretum's first director and as a Barnes Foundation trustee, until his death. 

Some of Wilson's trees still survive at the Arboretum of the Barnes Foundation.

References

Sources
Joseph Lapsley Wilson Scrapbook, Historical Society of Pennsylvania
Joseph Lapsley Wilson Correspondence, 1922-1926, Barnes Foundation
Joseph Lapsley Wilson Papers, First Troop Philadelphia City Cavalry.
Joseph Lapsley Wilson obituary, Philadelphia Evening Bulletin, April 12, 1928.

External links

1844 births
1928 deaths
American railroad executives
Burials at Laurel Hill Cemetery (Philadelphia)
Businesspeople from Philadelphia
People of Pennsylvania in the American Civil War